YESS may refer to:
 Youth Empowerment & Support Services, a youth empowerment and housing organization based in Edmonton, Canada
 Your Employment Settlement Service, a charity founded by Camilla Palmer

See also
 Yes (disambiguation)